Patella depressa is a species of sea snail, a true limpet, a marine gastropod mollusk in the family Patellidae, one of the families of true limpets.

Patella depressa is a nomen dubium according to Christiaens (1973, 1983); Patella intermedia gets priority. Nevertheless, the name Patella depressa is in usage among British authors (e.g. Graham, 1988) and is assumed as valid.

Description
The length of the shell attains 40.2 mm

Distribution
This marine species occurs off Morocco.

References
This article incorporates CC-BY-3.0 text from the reference.

 Knapp (1857). Notice of a marked variety of Patella vulgata (proposed to be named var. intermedia), found in Guernsey and Jersey (from Information communicated by Dr. Knapp). Annals and Magazine of Natural History (2) 19: 211-213.
 Mabille, J., 1888. De quelques coquilles nouvelles. Bulletin de la Société Philomathique de Paris 7(12): 73-82
 Backeljau, T. (1986). Lijst van de recente mariene mollusken van België [List of the recent marine molluscs of Belgium]. Koninklijk Belgisch Instituut voor Natuurwetenschappen: Brussels, Belgium. 106 pp. 
 Nakano T. & Ozawa T. (2007). Worldwide phylogeography of limpets of the order Patellogastropoda: molecular, morphological and paleontological evidence. Journal of Molluscan Studies 73(1): 79–99

External links
  Reeve, L. A. (1854-1855). Monograph of the genus Patella. In: Conchologia Iconica, or, illustrations of the shells of molluscous animals, vol. 8, pls 1-42 and unpaginated tex. L. Reeve & Co., London.
 Mabille, J. (1888). De quelques coquilles nouvelles. Bulletin de la Société Philomathique de Paris. ser. 7, 12 (2): 73-82
 Gmelin J.F. (1791). Vermes. In: Gmelin J.F. (Ed.) Caroli a Linnaei Systema Naturae per Regna Tria Naturae, Ed. 13. Tome 1(6). G.E. Beer, Lipsiae [Leipzig. pp. 3021-3910]
 Locard, A. (1891). Les coquilles marines des côtes de France. Annales de la Société Linnéenne de Lyon. 37: 1-385
 Pilsbry, H. A. (1891-1892). Manual of conchology, structural and systematic, with illustrations of the species. Ser. 1. Vol. 13: Acmaeidae, Lepetidae, Patellidae, Titiscaniidae. pp 1-195, pls 1-74. Philadelphia, published by the Conchological Section, Academy of Natural Sciences.
 Jeffreys J.G. (1862-1869). British conchology. Vol. 1: pp. cxiv + 341
 Pallary, P. (1920). Exploration scientifique du Maroc organisée par la Société de Géographie de Paris et continuée par la Société des Sciences Naturelles du Maroc. Deuxième fascicule. Malacologie. i>Larose, Rabat et Paris pp. 108. 1(1): map
  Koufopanou, V., Reid, D.G., Ridgeway, S.A., & Thomas, R.H. (1999). A molecular phylogeny of the patellid limpets (Gastropoda: Patellidae) and its implications for the origins of their antitropical distribution. Molecular Phylogenetics and Evolution. 11(1): 138-156.

Patellidae
Molluscs described in 1777
Taxa named by Thomas Pennant